Toticoryx is a spider genus of the jumping spider family, Salticidae. Its single described species, Toticoryx exilis is found in Guinea.

Name
The describers state that the genus name is an arbitrary combination of letters. The specific name exilis is Latin for "slender", referring to the spider's body shape.

Appearance
This spider is only 3 mm long and very flat. In general appearance it resembles Pseudicius. Only the female has been found.

References

Salticidae
Spiders of Africa
Monotypic Salticidae genera
Taxa named by Wanda Wesołowska